Nancy Twine is founder and CEO of Briogeo Hair Care, a leading authority on “green beauty,” and the youngest African-American to launch a product line at Sephora. Briogeo launched in 2013 and is sold online at Briogeo.com and at retail stores including Sephora (U.S., Middle East, South East Asia, Australia, and Europe), Nordstrom, MECCA, and ULTA Beauty, and has an estimated 2020 gross revenue of 40 million dollars. Briogeo Hair Care is currently backed by a minority-interest private equity partner, VMG. In April 2022, Briogeo was acquired by Wella.

Twine graduated from UVA’s McIntire School of Commerce.

Accolades 
 Forbes 30 Under 30 Judge (2020)
 CEW Female Founder Awards (2019)
 Nylon Beauty Innovator Award (2018)
 Inc. Female Founders 100 (2018)
 Goldman Sachs Builders + Innovators Award (2020)

References 

African-American company founders
Living people
Year of birth missing (living people)
Place of birth missing (living people)
McIntire School of Commerce alumni
American women chief executives
American chief executives of fashion industry companies
21st-century African-American people
21st-century African-American women